Ferocactus townsendianus is a species of Ferocactus from Mexico.

References

External links
 
 

townsendianus
Flora of Mexico
Plants described in 1922